In the theory of algebras over a field, mutation is a construction of a new binary operation related to the multiplication of the algebra.  In specific cases the resulting algebra may be referred to as a homotope or an isotope of the original.

Definitions

Let A be an algebra over a field F with multiplication (not assumed to be associative) denoted by juxtaposition.  For an element a of A, define the left a-homotope  to be the algebra with multiplication

Similarly define the left (a,b) mutation 

Right homotope and mutation are defined analogously.  Since the right (p,q) mutation of A is the left (−q, −p) mutation of the opposite algebra to A, it suffices to study left mutations.

If A is a unital algebra and a is invertible, we refer to the isotope by a.

Properties
 If A is associative then so is any homotope of A, and any mutation of A is Lie-admissible.
 If A is alternative then so is any homotope of A, and any mutation of A is Malcev-admissible.
 Any isotope of a Hurwitz algebra is isomorphic to the original.
 A homotope of a Bernstein algebra by an element of non-zero weight is again a Bernstein algebra.

Jordan algebras

A Jordan algebra is a commutative algebra satisfying the Jordan identity .  The Jordan triple product is defined by

For y in A the mutation or homotope Ay is defined as the vector space A with multiplication

and if y is invertible this is referred to as an isotope.  A homotope of a Jordan algebra is again a Jordan algebra: isotopy defines an equivalence relation.  If y is nuclear then the isotope by y is isomorphic to the original.

References

 
 

 
 

Non-associative algebras